European Chemist (EurChem) is an international professional qualification awarded by the European Chemist Registration Board of the European Chemical Society (EuChemS) for chemists and is for use in many European countries.

As Europe increasingly develops common standards, it is important that the professional competence of those who oversee the maintenance of standards is recognised. Academic qualifications alone have limited value. In providing an acceptable common professional standard, the European Chemist requires experience in the application of knowledge, level of skill, safety and environmental consciousness, sense of responsibility, ability to communicate and level of supervision received. Through the European Chemist designation the chemical societies in the EU have ensured that there is an easily understood title to indicate a high level of competence in the practice of chemistry. The award of EurChem will assist individual chemists who are moving from one employer to another in different member states, receiving equal treatment across the EU. 

EurChem Candidates must meet the following requirements:

Be a member of a participating national chemical society;
Hold a degree accredited by the participating national chemical society;
Have at least eight years of post-secondary school education/experience including a category-A schedule academic qualification;
Have at least three years' approved post-graduation professional experience ;
Two referees who must be members of the applicant's national chemical society;
Show proficient professional experience appearing out of:
Able to work in conditions with minor leadership
Applying knowledge
Consciousness of safety, health, and environment aspects
Demonstrate of professional skill
Excellent written and oral communications
Good people's management, advising, evaluating skills.

The title EurChem is post-nominal, i.e. it is placed after the name such as academic degrees. The ECRB maintains also a Register of European Chemists. The title is equivalent to the national chartered status, e.g. the title Chartered Chemist in the United Kingdom.

Recognition of the qualification and title are generally not specifically incorporated into national law, however in the United Kingdom the Privy Council has approved the use of the title; however in all cases approval is only after peer review by the appropriate national chemical society, in addition the EU Directive 89/48/EEC generally exempts a bearer from additional examination in the Union.

See also
British professional qualifications
European Engineer
European professional qualification directives

References

External links
website of the European Chemist Registration Board
European Chemist website of the Royal Society of Chemistry
"EurChem" – The Crown Jewel on a European Chemistry Education Ladder – ECTN Association

Professional certification in science